Wolverton is a village in north Hampshire, England.

History 
Named in the Domesday Book of 1086 as Ulvretune, Wolverton has a royal history.  Circa 885, King Alfred gave the area – along with neighbouring Baughurst – to the Diocese of Winchester.

Pipe Rolls identify the existence of a royal household in the village as early as the 12th century, and that Eleanor of Aquitaine resided there in 1165 while her husband – Henry II – was in Normandy.  The manor of Wolverton remained in royal ownership through the reigns of King John and Henry III, until possession was gained by the family of Peter Fitz Herbert some time after 1217.

In 1837, Sir Peter Pole sold the manor to Arthur Wellesley, 1st Duke of Wellington, and it remained part of the Wellington estate until 1943. The present-day Wolverton House is a late-Georgian manor house, near to St Catherine's Church.

References

External links

Villages in Hampshire